DNA Oyj (DNA Plc) is a Finnish telecommunications group that provides voice, data and TV services. In December 2020, it had over 3.5 million subscription customers. 2.7 million of the customers were using a mobile network and 0.9 million were using a fixed network. DNA is a wholly owned subsidiary of Telenor.

DNA founded its telecommunications operator activities in 2001. It also produces cable TV services. The Group also includes DNA Store, Finland's largest retail chain selling mobile phones.

In April 2019, Telenor announced that it would buy the majority of DNA. DNA exited the Helsinki Stock Exchange in February 2020.

History

Finnet-liitto and DNA Finland Oy (1999–2006)

DNA traces its beginnings to the "Suomen 3P" mobile phone operations division of the Finnet group of telephone cooperatives. Finnet group was originally founded in 1921 as a grouping of the over 400 privately owned telephone cooperatives. In October 2000, Suomen 3P became DNA Finland Oy. DNA's customers were originally using a network owned by Suomen 2G Oy.

In the beginning, owners consisted of approximately 40 Finnish telephone companies. DNA was granted a national 3G licence in 1999 and a GSM mobile communication network licence in 2000. A new national mobile phone service was being prepared to be able to construct of a GSM network. February 2001 marked the launch of the DNA brand, the opening of the network and the first available DNA subscriptions.

In 2003, DNA acquired the mobile communication, distribution and network businesses previously owned by Telia Mobile AB's Finnish subsidiary.

Finnet Oy becomes DNA Ltd (2007)
In 2007, there began to be new difficulties between the remaining Finnet companies. The largest members merged themselves with DNA and left the association. In July Finnet Oy changed its name to DNA Ltd. In addition to its mobile communication operations, the company now also had a fixed network business with voice, data, cable TV and security services for both homes and corporations. As its core business changed, DNA went from being a mobile communication operator to a telecommunications company.

DNA Ltd (2008–2015)

In May 2010, DNA had approximately 3 million customers, of which almost 600,000 were cable television customers. This represented a 43% market share of the cable television market.

In 2011, DNA challenged a long-time dominated Digita Oy in the Finnish terrestrial television network markets, and constructed its own competing digital-terrestrial television network with DVB-T2 technology.

In 2013, DNA was the only television operator to transmit HD channels in the antenna network. DNA Welho television services were reached by most of Finnish households.

In 2014, DNA and Sonera (now Telia Finland) established a joint venture company called Suomen Yhteisverkko Oy, of which its purpose is to build and deploy a shared 4G LTE mobile network in remote Northern and Eastern Finland using the 800 MHz (LTE Band 20) "digital dividend" band. DNA owns 49% of this joint venture.

In April 2015, DNA launched a one-brand strategy and combined the previously separate DNA Store, DNA Welho and DNA Business brands under the renewed DNA brand. DNA had net sales of 829 million euros, and its business profit was almost three times that of the previous year (73 million euros). DNA's largest shareholder was investment company Finda, which owned 49.9 per cent of the company. The second largest shareholder was PHP Holding with a 37.5 per cent share of ownership. The third largest shareholder was employment pension company Ilmarinen with a 5 per cent share.

DNA Plc (2016–2019)

In autumn 2016, DNA was listed on the Helsinki Stock Exchange. At the end of the year, DNA's 4G network reached 99.6% of the population in mainland Finland. DNA launched a next-generation fibre optic network and a 1 Gigabit broadband.

In the spring of 2018, DNA announced that it had started collaborating with US telecommunications giant Cisco Systems in Industrial Internet services. More than 55 service providers around the world are connected to Cisco's Jasper platform. The system manages IoT devices in more than 550 operators’ networks. Jasper is used by, for example, ABB, Amazon, Daimler, DHL, Ford, GM and Heineken. DNA simultaneously joined the international Cisco-driven IoT World Alliance to provide connections around the world.

In January 2019 DNA acquired the lower-cost MVNO Moi Mobiili  which had used the DNA/Yhteisverkko mobile network since 2016. During the same month DNA launched a 5G network in central Helsinki. The network was planned to be expanded once terminal devices that support 5G are commonly would be available on the market. DNA was also piloting the use of fixed 5G. In February DNA announced that it had signed a financing agreement worth 90 million euros with the European Investment Bank. The loan was needed for investments related to the 5G network and to increase the capacity of the 4G network. In April Telenor announced that it would buy the majority of DNA. In July DNA announced that it would sell its antenna network pay-TV operations to Digita. The transaction was approved by the competition authorities in September.

DNA under Telenor’s ownership (2020–)
DNA's antenna network pay-TV operations was transferred to Digita in early 2020. In February, Telenor acquired ownership of all DNA shares, and DNA exited the stock exchange.

Organization
DNA has two business segments: Consumer and Corporate Business. 97.87 percent of DNA is owned by the Norwegian telecommunications company Telenor.

DNA’s Consumer Business
DNA provides consumers with various telecommunications services:
mobile phones and mobile subscriptions
broadband services (mobile and fixed)
information security services
TV services from subscriptions to channel packages
fixed-line subscriptions

DNA’s Corporate Business
DNA provides companies with various communication and networking services:
mobile services
telecommunication services
voice communication services
services for other telecommunications operators.

Network

The company's mobile phone network covers the entire Finland. In northern and eastern Finland, DNA cooperates with Telia through Finnish Shared Network (Suomen Yhteisverkko), which they founded together.

In the spring of 2018, DNA announced that it had started updating its core network to the 5G era.

In early January 2019, DNA launched its 5G network in central Helsinki. DNA also piloted the use of fixed 5G (Fixed Wireless Access technology) in Vantaa and later in the spring of 2019, elsewhere in Finland. In December 2019, DNA started selling a DNA Home 5G service. The service was targeted for example for detached homes for which a fibre-optic connection was not available or it would be very expensive to build.

In January 2020, DNA started selling 5G subscriptions to private and corporate customers. In the beginning of 2020 DNA's 5G services were available in Espoo, Heinola, Helsinki, Hyvinkää, Hämeenlinna, Jyväskylä, Kuopio, Lahti, Lempäälä, Lieto, Nokia, Oulu, Pirkkala, Pori, Raisio, Rauma, Rusko, Seinäjoki, Sipoo,  Tampere, Turku, Vaasa, Vantaa and Ylöjärvi.

Personnel policy
DNA started to liberate its occupational culture in 2012. According to DNA's policy, employees who, for example, do not work in customer service have the freedom of flextime and remote work and have agreed-upon objectives. Remote work does not need to be approved by a supervisor, and even an entire team can work remotely from, for example, Tenerife. In 2017, DNA also increased the flexibility of working hours in customer service by introducing flexible working hours in corporate customer service and enabling remote work in consumer customer service.

In 2017, DNA was reportedly the first workplace in Finland to introduce grandparental leave. All employees who have had a grandchild after the beginning of 2017 are entitled to the leave. The leave was related to the Family Federation of Finland's Family-Friendly Workplace pilot program. The concept was innovated by a member of the staff.

DNA employees can also support elderly family members who live in another municipality by taking advantage of the possibility to work remotely as well as a benefit introduced in early 2020, where the employer pays more than half of the use of a friend service. An employee of the friend service can, for example, take the family member for a walk or cook meals during their few-hour-visit every week.

References

Internet service providers of Finland
Mobile phone companies of Finland
Companies formerly listed on Nasdaq Helsinki